Anne Edward Marie Van Lancker (born 4 March 1954) is a Belgian politician and a former Member of the European Parliament (until 2009) for Belgium with the Socialistische Partij Anders (sp.a), part of the Socialist Group and sat on the European Parliament's Committee on Employment and Social Affairs and its Committee on Women's Rights and Gender Equality.

She was a substitute for the Committee on Development and a member of the Delegation to the ACP-EU Joint Parliamentary Assembly.

Anne Van Lancker was the only Belgian MEP in the European Convention, that presented a draft constitution for the EU in 2003. Her work during that convention earned her the title 'tireless battler for a social Europe' from Financial Times journalist Peter Norman.

She also chairs , the women's organisation of sp.a.

Education
 She followed secondary education at the Sint-Lodewijkscollege in Lokeren.
 1978: Degree in sociology (sociology of work)
 1988: Postgraduate degree in social legislation

Career
 1978-1979: Academic researcher, HIVA (Institute for Labour Studies)
 1979-1984: Assistant at the faculty of work sociology, Catholic University of Leuven
 1984-1988: Member of staff of research department at SEVI (Emile Vandervelde Institute Research and Documentation Centre)
 1988-1989: Assistant, parliamentary SP group
 1989-1990: Deputy head, office of the Flemish Minister of Employment
 1990-1992: Head of office of the Flemish Minister of Employment
 1992-1994: Head of private office to the Flemish Minister of Employment and Social Affairs
 since 1994: Member of the SP.A party bureau
 since 1999: Member of the SP.A executive
 since 1995: Member of party council, Ghent
 Member of the East Flanders provincial executive
 since 1999: Chairwoman of Zijkant
 since 1994: Member of the European Parliament

See also
 2004 European Parliament election in Belgium

External links

 
 Her page at her party
  Her page at the Belgian EU convention site
 
 

1954 births
Living people
Socialist feminists
Socialistische Partij Anders MEPs
MEPs for Belgium 1994–1999
MEPs for Belgium 1999–2004
MEPs for Belgium 2004–2009
20th-century women MEPs for Belgium
21st-century women MEPs for Belgium
People from Temse